The Handeni–Kiberashi–Chemba–Kwa_Mtoro–Singida Road, also Handeni–Singida Road, is a road in Tanzania, connecting the towns of Handeni, and Singida in Tanzania.

Location

Upgrades and reconstruction
This road, connects the regions of Tanga, Dodoma and Singida. It tracks the general direction of the East African Crude Oil Pipeline from Hoima, in Uganda to Chongoleani in Tanzania.

The government of Tanzania has plans to upgrade this road to class-2 bitumen surface and improvement of drainage channels and culverts. In May 2018, the government availed TZS:1 billion (approx. US$440,000), as a down-payment on the project, including the resettlement of the affected people.

See also
 List of roads in Tanzania
 Transport in Tanzania

References

External links
 About Tanzania National Roads Agency
 

Roads in Tanzania
Geography of Tanzania
Transport in Tanzania
East African Community